Susan Garriock is a former British slalom canoeist who competed in the 1980s. She won a silver medal in the K-1 team event at the 1983 ICF Canoe Slalom World Championships in Meran.

References

British female canoeists
Living people
Year of birth missing (living people)
Place of birth missing (living people)
Medalists at the ICF Canoe Slalom World Championships